Ibrahim Mehraban Roudbaneh (born 11 February 1972) is an Iranian former wrestler who competed in the 1996 Summer Olympics.

References

External links
 

1972 births
Living people
Olympic wrestlers of Iran
Wrestlers at the 1996 Summer Olympics
Iranian male sport wrestlers
Asian Games gold medalists for Iran
Asian Games medalists in wrestling
Wrestlers at the 1994 Asian Games
Medalists at the 1994 Asian Games
20th-century Iranian people
21st-century Iranian people